Liga ASOBAL 2010–11 season was the 21st since its establishment. Ciudad Real were the defending champions, having won their 5th La Liga title in the previous season. The campaign began on Saturday, 11 September 2010. The league was originally scheduled to end on 21 May 2011. A total of 16 teams contested the league, 14 of which had already been contested in the 2009–10 season, and two of which were promoted from the División de Plata.

Barcelona Borges won their tenth ASOBAL title.

Promotion and relegation 
Teams promoted from 2009–10 División de Honor B de Balonmano
 Alser Puerto Sagunto
 Quabit Guadalajara

Teams relegated to 2010–11 División de Honor B de Balonmano
 Octavio Pilotes Posada
 CB Cangas (Frigoríficos del Morrazo)

Team information

League table 
Final standings

Top goal scorers

See also
División de Plata de Balonmano 2010–11

References

External links
Standings
Liga ASOBAL

Liga ASOBAL seasons
1
Spa